is a private girls academy founded on November 6, 1884, in Azabu, Minato, Tokyo by Martha J. Cartmell, a Methodist missionary from Canada. Toyo Eiwa Women's University, established as a four-year college in 1989, is attached to the school.

History
Originally begun in 1884 with two students, an elementary school was added in 1888, and a senior high school in 1889. The school expanded to include a kindergarten class in 1914, a dormitory, kindergarten building, and a house for the Methodist missionaries in 1932, and a brand new building for the school in 1933.

The name was changed back in 1946. Because of the changes made in the Japanese education system following World War II, each department changed its name to reflect the new government-approved names. In 1965, facilities were expanded to include a location at Oiwake, Karuizawa, Nagano Prefecture and camp was established in 1970 at Lake Nojiri.

In 1986, the junior college was moved to a campus in Midori-ku, Yokohama, the attached women's university became a four-year college in 1989, and opened its graduate school in 1993.

Schools
Toyo Eiwa University
Tōyō Eiwa Girls' Junior & Senior High School
Tōyō Eiwa Girls' Primary School
Tōyō Eiwa Kindergarten (co-ed)
Tōyō Eiwa University Kaede Kindergarten (co-ed), located in Aoba-ku, Yokohama

Notable graduates
Misako Yasui, legislator
Ruiko Yoshida, photojournalist
Katayama Hiroko, translator and mentor to Hanako Muraoka
Byakuren Yanagiwara, writer and confidante of Hanako Muraoka
Hanako Muraoka, translator into Japanese of the Anne of Green Gables novels and other Western literature
Junko Endo, wife of Shūsaku Endō
Fumiko Higashikuni, picture book writer and member of Higashikuni-no-miya
Sawako Agawa, television personality
Eri Muraoka, daughter of Haruko Muraoka
Nobuko Imai, violist
Tae Ashida, fashion designer
Mieko Yagi, equestrian
Karin Miyawaki, fencer
Mieko Takamine, actress
Keiko Han, voice actress
Hanako Oshima, singer
Miho Ohwada, actress

Fictional references
Rei Hino, also known as Sailor Mars in the anime series Sailor Moon, attends T*A Girls Academy, a private Catholic school, which is based on Tōyō Eiwa Jogakuin.

References

External links

 Tōyō Eiwa Jogakuin
 Tōyō Eiwa Jogakuin

Universities and colleges in Tokyo
Educational institutions established in 1884
Universities and colleges in Yokohama
Private universities and colleges in Japan
Women's universities and colleges in Japan
1884 establishments in Japan